Kirzya (Kirźä) is a rural locality (a selo) and the administrative centre of Kirzinsky Selsoviet, Karaidelsky District, Bashkortostan, Russia. The population was 459 as of 2010. There are 9 streets.

Geography 
Kirzya is located 97 km southwest of Karaidel (the district's administrative centre) by road. Surda is the nearest rural locality.

References 

Rural localities in Karaidelsky District